Kouthala is a Mandal in Komaram Bheem district in the state of Telangana in India.
Climate in Kouthala, Komaram Bheem and Mancherial are registered as so hot and became the Earth's hottest place by crossing El Azizia by 0.2 points and became the Earth's highest ever recorded temperature.

Koutala temples:

1.Shivalay temple 2. Sai baba temple 3. Sri Ramalayam temple 4. Kanyaka parmeshwari temple

References 

Villages in Komaram Bheem district
Mandals in Komaram Bheem district